D.K.M. College for Women, is a women's general degree college located in Vellore, Tamil Nadu. It was established in the year 1972. The college is affiliated with Thiruvalluvar University. This college offers different courses in arts, commerce and science.

Departments

Science
Physics
Commerce
Chemistry
Mathematics
Biochemistry
Biotechnology
Microbiology
Food and Nutrition
Botany
Zoology
Psychology
Computer Science

Arts and Commerce
Tamil
English
History
Economics
Business Administration
Commerce

Accreditation
The college is  recognized by the University Grants Commission (UGC).

References

External links

Educational institutions established in 1972
1972 establishments in Tamil Nadu
Colleges affiliated to Thiruvalluvar University
Academic institutions formerly affiliated with the University of Madras